Oscoda Area Schools is a public school district in the U.S. state of Michigan serving pre-kindergarten through twelfth grade, and draws its approximately 1,956 students from Oscoda and Au Sable townships in Iosco County, Michigan as well as part of southern Alcona County, Michigan.

The district includes Richardson Elementary School (Pre-K to 6) and Oscoda Area High School (7-12), both located in AuSable Township.

External links
Iosco Regional Educational Service Agency
Oscoda Area Schools

School districts in Michigan
Education in Iosco County, Michigan
Education in Alcona County, Michigan